Flexivirga oryzae is a Gram-positive, strictly aerobic and non-motile bacterium from the genus Flexivirga which has been isolated from soil from a rice field from Korea.

References

External links
Type strain of Flexivirga oryzae at BacDive -  the Bacterial Diversity Metadatabase

Micrococcales
Bacteria described in 2017